, known simply as 11eyes in its anime adaptation, is a Japanese adult visual novel developed and published by Lass first released on April 25, 2008, for a Microsoft Windows PC as a DVD; 11 eyes is Lass' fourth game. A port playable on the Xbox 360 entitled 11eyes CrossOver was released on April 2, 2009, published by 5pb. A manga adaptation illustrated by Naoto Ayano began serialization in the October 2009 issue of Kadokawa Shoten's Comp Ace magazine. An anime television series adaptation by Doga Kobo aired in Japan from October to December 2009. A fan disc for Windows entitled 11eyes -Resona Forma- was planned for release at Fall 2010. The anime has been licensed in North America by Sentai Filmworks; distributor Section23 Films announced that it would release the complete box set on January 11, 2011.

Plot
Since losing his sister seven years ago, Kakeru Satsuki has led a vacant life. He has only been able to return to normal with help from his childhood friend, Yuka Minase, and other friends at school. Then one day the sky turns red, the moon turns black, everyone around Kakeru and Yuka disappears and monsters start roaming the streets. This virtual world is nicknamed "Red Night" by the pair. After several more incidents, they find four other humans affected by this mysterious phenomenon: Misuzu Kusakabe, a red-haired onmyouji swordswoman; Kukuri Tachibana, a strange mute girl who resembles Kakeru's deceased sister in both looks and name; Yukiko Hirohara, a lively young girl who takes on the personality of a cold killer when her glasses are removed; and Takahisa Tajima, a young pyrokineticist with a heated attitude to boot. Kakeru wants to protect Yuka in return for her constant support and kindness, but is unable to awaken his own hidden power, which Misuzu promises will eventually appear. The six of them band together to survive with their special powers, but are soon targeted by grotesque creatures nicknamed "Black Knights" whose ultimate goal is to kill them. The plot thickens when the teenagers find a girl named Lisette trapped in a red crystal guarded by the Black Knights, who begs them to save her from this prison. What is the mystery behind this mysterious phenomenon of Red Night? Who are the Black Knights, and how are they connected to Lisette? Furthermore, is Kukuri's resemblance to Kakeru's dead sister really coincidence? What about Yuka and Kakeru's powers?

Characters

 (PC), Daisuke Ono (Xbox 360 & anime)
The main protagonist of the series. He and his sister were orphaned in their youth, and went to an orphanage where they first met Yuka. After his older sister committed suicide ten years prior to the main storyline, Kakeru felt that his life was empty. This was later filled by Yuka and his new friends he met in high school. He has heterochromia and wears an eyepatch over his right eye, known as the eye of Aeon, which holds what seems to be the power of precognition. It also shows him images of Velad, an ancient King of Drasuvania who also apparently possessed the eye. He is able to use his right eye in battle to predict and counter his opponent's moves. In the VN, the real power of the eye of Aeon not only covers precognition, but also allows the bearer to assimilate all the memories and abilities of countless previous bearers. Ultimately, it also allows the bearer to realize the desired future out of all the possible futures there are. The price for those powers is that upon death, the bearer's soul is absorbed into the eye as it's being passed on to a new bearer. This explains why Kakeru dreams of Velad, who was the previous bearer of the eye. The Eye of Aeon is also a magic stone on its own and is not a fragment of Liselotte's voidstone, nor can it increase her power; a complete opposite from the anime where it was the most important fragment. After this fact is revealed, the Black Knights are no longer after Kakeru's life and he is given the option to walk away from the ongoing conflicts, although he decides to keep fighting with his friends.

Kakeru's childhood best friend. She met him at the orphanage where they grew up, and was able to help Kakeru feel better after his sister's suicide. She now attends the same high school as Kakeru and spends most of her time with him, causing most other characters to believe that she is Kakeru's girlfriend. In the later part of the story, she discovers that she also has a power that seems to negate others' powers. She and Kukuri name the power "Hand of Glory". However, it's merely a misconception of her and other companions in the "Red Night". Later in the game, she was able to remember why the bloody event at Ayame orphanage, where she, Kakeru, and Kukuri used to live as orphans, happened. It turned out that because her power was awakened and she did not know how to control it at the time, it wreaked havoc in the orphanage. The orphans living there started to go insane and killed each other. She explained Kukuri and Kakeru weren't affected due to her power to nullify. This event had such an impact on her that she sealed this portion of memories in her mind ever since and did not dare to go near the orphanage once she was adopted. Liselotte, while using her connection with the "fragments", tells Yuka that her power is "Phantasmagoria", a special technique/spell used by Liselotte herself. The power allows her to bring out others' worst memories or show people illusions of her own design. She explains that her power appears to nullify others because while being affected by Phantasmagoria, people unconsciously lose the will to maintain their power so it appears as though the power is nullified. While being conscious of her own power, she uses it to try to keep Kakeru to herself by using her power on the whole group and create an illusionary world. She later fades away and is absorbed by Liselotte because she uses up all her power creating the perfect world.

 (PC), Yuu Asakawa (Xbox 360 & anime)
A red-haired swordswoman. She is one year older than Yuka and Kakeru. She is an Onmyoji from the Kusakabe clan, a clan of Onmyoji that is famous for having Oni's blood in the bloodline and the five demonic swords known as Kusakabe's Five Treasures. Misuzu possesses all five swords, keeping them in her fingernails by using dimensional magic that she learned from forbidden scrolls that were created by one of her ancestors who learned and incorporated Western magic, Kusakabe Ryoichi. While she appears to be strong, Misuzu is the weakest mind of the group. She is traumatized when Misao reveals the truth about the "fragments". For a short few days when Misao gives the remainder of the group time to think over whether they decide to continue to be her and Avaritia's opponents or to commit suicide themselves, Misuzu considers killing herself and is snapped back by Kakeru. Misuzu has feelings for Kakeru. In the final battle, she gives all she has to kill Misao by using Doujikiri Yasutsuna.

 (PC), Noriko Rikimaru (Xbox 360 & anime)
A strange girl from their school who looks exactly like Kakeru's dead sister. She is one year older than Yuka and Kakeru. She has the ability to materialize her soul into the form of an angel that appears chained. She calls the angel "Abraxas". "Abraxas" attacks by sending out chains with sharp blades and has healing powers. She is the adopted daughter of the famous novelist in the area from whom she inherited her last name. She has no memories beyond five years ago, when she was 13, and seems to have lost her voice. She uses a sketchbook for communication. In one scene of 11eyes CrossOver, it is noted by Shuu indirectly that her power is unique and incredibly difficult to reproduce by mages. The chains on Abraxas are actually representation of Kukuri's lost memories. The chains are also seals of Abraxas power. In the final battle, due to Yuka's power, her lost memories return to her and Abraxas is unchained. She reveals that she is in fact Satsuki Kukuri, Kakeru's sister from an alternate reality. In her original reality, it was Kakeru who was killed in an experiment causing her to go berserk and destroy an entire facility. After that, she was transported to this reality. She reveals that her parents aren't dead but rather that Kakeru, Yuka and she were abandoned due to their powers. She also reveals that Ayame orphanage is actually a place where children with powers are assembled for research, and that the founder of the place is one of Misuzu's maternal ancestors. While unchained, Abraxas's name is "Demiurge" and has godly powers. Her left eye can peek into the past while her right eye has a power similar to the precognition power of the eye of Aeon. She also has the power of spontaneous generation (i.e., creating things from nothing). Kukuri is the only heroine in this game to have her ending as a separate act.

 (PC), Oma Ichimura (Xbox 360 & anime)
A lively girl who is later seen killing monsters mercilessly during the Red Night. She is a granddaughter of the Hirohara Zaibatsu, one of the richest houses in the 11eyes world. She came back to Japan from the nation Dransvania. Her primary power of regeneration makes her almost immortal. She fights using two knives. Her positive personality is maintained by a self-hypnotic suggestion while she is wearing her glasses. When the glasses are removed, her eyes and personality turn into that of a killing machine. She is one year younger than Yuka and Kakeru. When Takahisa goes berserk due to Saiko's death, she kills him as an act of mercy to free his mind from Liselotte's influence. After killing Takahisa she realizes that she loved him. In the anime her fragment is ripped out by Superbia, killing her, while in the game she is absorbed by Liselotte.

 (PC), Showtaro Morikubo (Xbox 360 & anime)
A young man from their school who is a pyrokineticist. He is in the same grade as Yuka and Kakeru, but is not from their class. His personality is brash and that of a loner and is easily identified with a grey mullet. He is now under the guardianship of Saeko. In his childhood, he was trying his best to survive after his parents abandoned him. Saeko was the one that took him in, but he has little to no respect for her in spite of that. Saeko first saw Tajima when she was hiding from the police. He was also the one who discovered the wall that prevents the characters from escaping the city and thus the Red Night. In the anime he lost control of himself and let the fire demon inside him take over. After destroying half the city he asked Yukiko to kill him before the fire demon completely took control of him. On 11eyes -Resona Forma- Takahisa has younger sister named Ema.

Black Knights

 (PC & Xbox 360), Yoji Ueda (anime)
 The leader of the black knights and determined to crush the "fragments". He is one of the 14 saints from Index, called "George of the Rainbow". He was sent out with his subordinates to eliminate Index top priority threat, Liselotte Werckmeister. After a seemingly losing battle with Liselotte at Ayame's Hill 70 years ago, he used his last resort, the forbidden technique, Contract of the Rainbow to split Liselotte's soul and the piece of Emerald Tablet within her into seven fragments to weaken her. Liselotte with one of the fragments remaining in her body was sealed within the crystal. The other fragments, due to the technique, were scattered across six parallel worlds. This explains why he calls the gang "fragments" because their bodies contain those "fragments" and those "fragments" are the sources of their powers. In his past mission, he sealed a dragon within his body with the same technique and releases it in the final battle to crush the "fragments" and Liselotte with the price of losing himself. It took a lot out of him to maintain seal of the dragon within his body and at the same time Liselotte's seal.

 (PC & Xbox 360), Yuki Fujiwara (anime)
The second Black Knight to be slain. Killed by Kakeru, a slimly muscular male with predatory, slanted red eyes. He is armed with scythes embedded on his forearms. He specializes in Chinese martial arts. He is actually an apostle of Index and at the same time a subordinate of George of the Rainbow. His index's name is "Sebastian of the Holy Bone".

 (PC), Noriko Rikimaru (Xbox 360)
She is the only female Black Knight beside Superbia and is the only member with wings that can fly. She uses a sword that resembles a spine that specializes for long range attack. The fourth knight to be killed. She plans to explode herself and take down everyone in Kakeru's gang with her. Her attempt fails due to Yuka's awakened power and Yukiko kills her by stabbing her forehead. She is also a subordinate of George of the Rainbow and her Index's name is "Elaine of the Dragon Skeleton". In the game, it is revealed that she loves Sebastian.

 (PC & Xbox 360), Yoshiya Naruke (anime)
The "mage" of the group. He is after the bearer of the eye of Aeon and uses scrolls as his weapons. He is quickly killed by Kukuri, however one part of its head "scholastica" manages to flee. However it is killed by Shiori afterwards. In the game, his two-parted head is cut down by Misuzu using Doujikiri and Scholastica dies at this time instead and Acedia is killed by Shiori afterward. Scholastica is actually Acedia's sister and they share a body. His Index's name is "Benedict of the Bookshelf". It is revealed by Shiori that Benedict and George are people in her family line. Shiori refers to him as her prototype when she kills him.

 (PC & Xbox 360), Teruyuki Tanzawa (anime)
One of the Black Knights, whose figure is a giant fat male with a club as its weapon. He is also the first one to die. He was killed by Misuzu. His role in the story and within the Black Knight group is most minor. His Index's name is "Samson of the Holy Club".

 (PC), Hyo-sei (Xbox 360)
The most powerful Black Knight after Avaritia. She fights using two Japanese swords that are similar to Misuzu's. She is in fact the only Black Knight who has no association with Index. Rather, she is actually Kusakabe Misao, the Kusakabe onmyoji that Misuzu admires. She reveals that her two swords were part of Kusakabe's treasures. The swords she has, Onikiri and Kumokiri, in additions to Misuzu's, were once referred as Kusakabe's Seven Swords. After she took the two swords and left her clan, the swords that Misuzu has then became Kusakabe's Five Treasures. In the game, she looks down on all the "fragments" and Kakeru except Shiori because only Shiori is strong enough to fight her. She is also the only member of the Black Knights who is actually alive or living without burden. The four subordinates of George are actually dead and their souls are bound by her with Larva (the Red Night's creatures) as their bodies. She also sealed the memories they had while they were alive. She also contributes part of her power to help keeping the dragon sealed within George. It is hinted that she helps George and his group because she admires and loves him.
They are named after the 7 Cardinal Sins.

Sub characters

 (PC), Emiko Hagiwara (Xbox 360 & anime)
She is a "traditional magician" and is usually seen with a book. She seemed indifferent to the students who approached her in class at first but eventually warmed up to Kaori and Tadashi and grew to treasure them due to their friendly spirit. Her secret identity is that of an apostle of Index, the largest magical organization within the world of 11eyes and 3days. Her real name given by Index is "Ursula of the Bookshelf". She transferred to Kakeru's school to monitor the place and report its situation to Index. Her assignment was due to the sudden disappearance of the last warden. She is extremely powerful and is a candidate for the next 14 saints, the highest officials within Index. However, her family line is cursed to be born without eyeballs. In her case, the curse is even worse and she couldn't even move a finger. Her current body is a magical artifact that her brain and nervous system were transplanted into and which allows her to hold 5000 magical books within. The body operates by absorbing magical energy. In the anime she gave her fragment to Kakeru to send Liselotte to the space-time rift. She is a classmate of Yuka and Kakeru. One of the main heroines in 11eyes CrossOver.

 (PC), Kaori Mizuhashi (Xbox 360 & anime)
She is a good friend of Yuka and Kakeru, often seen hitting Tadashi due to his personality. She is also a classmate of Yuka and Kakeru. One of the main heroines in 11eyes CrossOver. Her involvement in 11eyes CrossOver is due to her being a target of the doppelganger.

 (PC), Kouta Nemoto (Xbox 360)
A good friend of Yuka and Kakeru, who is often hit by Kaori. His role in the story is that of the class clown and the perverted friend. He is a classmate of Yuka and Kakeru.

 (PC), Chiaki Takahashi (Xbox 360 & anime)
The doctor at the school. The current guardian of Takahisa. In her youth, she was the gang leader of an all girl gang called "Kurenai Tenyo".

 (PC), Ayano Niina (Xbox 360)
The girl in the crystal who is tied deeply to the world of the "Red Night" itself. While she is basically good at heart, she has a split personality known as Liselotte Werckmeister. It is Liselotte who is the master of the "Red Night". Lisette was raped and almost killed as a child, and due to that incident Liselotte was born.

 (PC & Xbox 360)
Also called Velad or Vlad. He is the mysterious man appeared in Kakeru's dreams, who also possesses the Eye of Aeon. It is revealed that he is King of Drasuvania. He was Liselotte's lover. It was because of his death that she decided to destroy the world using the "Black Moon".

New characters in 11eyes CrossOver

The protagonist in 11eyes CrossOver. He is known as a "modern mage", those who activate their sorceries using technology such as cell phones linking to servers that can access the spiritual plane instead of using grimories. Apparently, this was a special method created by his grandfather. He is from the same class as Yuka, Kakeru, Shione and Mio.

She is from the same class as Yuka, Kakeru, Mio and Shū. She had a crush on Shū and confessed to him. However, she was rejected, as Shū was afraid that his life of a magician would put her in danger.

Another character being able to use "modern magic". Her father happened to be Shū's grandfather's student, explaining her knowledge in the special magic style. She is from the same class as Yuka, Kakeru, Shione and Shū.

A classmate of Takahisa. Often seen with a book. She is secretly the main antagonist of 11eyes CrossOver. She is an extremely powerful witch who has been living for over a century. She is even more powerful than Shiori and is able to call for her koyu kekkai by just a finger snap. She seems to be well aware of the "Red Night" and its purpose, but she avoid letting others besides Shiori knows that fact. She belongs to Thule Society, a group of magical organization created by the Nazi during World War II and consist of seven extremely powerful dark art users to oppose and try to eliminate Index. She has a Kirakishou-Suigintou complex with Liselotte. It's through her manipulation and engineering that send the doppelganger to kidnap and sacrifice the victims' live force to the "Artificial Emerald Tablet" inside her mirror Koyu Kekkai. The "Artificial Emerald" is her plan of secret world domination. The "Artificial Emerald Tablet" is created by the sacrificed life forces of specific people and would be completed once the ten thousandth victim is sacrificed. While under construction, the "Artificial Emerald Tablet" allows her to tune magical power within her mirror koyu kekkai to her own advantage so other people can't activate their sorcery inside it. Upon completion, the effect of the tablet would extend to the whole world and she would basically be able dominate the world since there would be no magus or other sorcery users to stop her. She claims part of the reason for doing this is to prevent Liselotte from destroying the world.

New characters in 11eyes Resona Forma

The founder and current pope of the Holy Office of Index. She has been the head of Index for almost a millennium, making her the oldest character of 11eyes. For that, some apostles of Index called her  out of respect. In addition, Johanna is also known for having been collecting magical items from around the world to prevent them from falling into the wrong hands, thus, giving her the name Johanna of the Vault. Apparently, the most valuable and powerful item that she collected is the God's Name Tablet, the largest fragment of the Emerald Tablet found.

Index's top researcher and the creator of Shiori's artificial body. She used to be a member of Thule Society, but it was only for having funding for her research and Sophia herself was not very devoted to the organization. After Germany's defeat in 1945, she joined Index.

A first year of Kouryoukan Academy and Takahisa's younger sister. During her childhood, she was frequently abused by her father and her older brother Takahisa was the only one who actually cared for her. After an event when Takahisa accidentally burned the house down with his newly awakened power while trying to save his sister from their father, they had to move to Ayame Garden. However, Takahisa ran off from the orphanage not long afterwards, as he feared that his power would also kill his sister like how he killed his father.

Media

Video games

 11eyes ~Tsumi to Batsu to Aganai no Shoujo~
 Released for PC on April 25, 2008.
 11eyes Crossover
 A modified version of the original. Adult content was removed but some additional story and characters were introduced. Released for Xbox 360 on April 2, 2009, for PSP on January 28, 2010, and for iOS on December 2, 2010.
 11eyes -Resona Forma-
 A fandisc released for PC on April 15, 2011.

Anime

Music
The original 11eyes visual novel has three pieces of theme music; one opening theme, one ending theme, and one insert song. A soundtrack album of music from the games was released on May 5, 2009, by Lass, although it was never sold commercially. The anime series' opening theme is "Arrival of Tears" by Ayane, and the ending theme is "Sequentia" by Asriel. The trailer of the PSP version of 11eyes Crossover used the song  by Ayane.

Reception
The anime's music was cited as one of its strong points by Anime News Network's Theron Martin. Martin said 11 Eyes tries to "do something different" for the genre but it doesn't have "the caliber" for this. He praised some things: the plot twist, and the second half of the series but he stated the good moments are "infrequent". Chris Beveridge from Mania.com compared it with Venus Versus Virus, and noted 11 Eyes "has some nice ideas but didn't execute it well".

References

External links
 11eyes visual novel official website  
 11eyes CrossOver official website 
 11eyes -Resona Forma- official website  
 11eyes anime official website 
 11eyes anime at Dogakobo 
 
 

2008 video games
2009 Japanese television series endings
2009 manga
Action anime and manga
Anime series
Anime television series based on video games
Doga Kobo
Eroge
Horror anime and manga
Japan-exclusive video games
Kadokawa Shoten manga
Manga based on video games
PlayStation Portable games
School life in anime and manga
Seinen manga
Sentai Filmworks
Supernatural thriller anime and manga
Video games developed in Japan
Visual novels
Windows games
Xbox 360 games